Pride of Africa may refer to:
 Pride of Africa (train)
 Pride of Africa (song)